North Miami Beach Senior High School (NMB High School) is a secondary school located at 1247 NE 167 Street in North Miami Beach, Florida, United States. Its current principal is Randy Milliken. NMB High School was built in 1971 as an overcrowding reliever school for North Miami High School and Miami Norland High School.

NMB High School was a pioneer in school construction; it was the first high school in Dade County  to be built with no windows, and was therefore completely air-conditioned.

History

NMB High School's style of education, with no traditional letter grades, created tension within middle- and upper-middle-class North Dade County families, whose older children had attended and graduated from traditional Dade County schools. They were not happy that their younger children would be placed in an experimental school that eschewed the traditions the parents knew, as the Miami Herald reported at the time. However, by the time the school was four years old, the non-traditional approach had been abandoned.

NMB had an award-winning TV Production program led by teacher Patrica Nelson Miller from the late 1970s through the 1990s and early 2000s.  The revolutionary program included a video yearbook, daily closed-circuit newscast and both prosumer and professional equipment.  Alan Page was responsible for all technical facilities and worked closely with students and teachers to maintain equipment. Mr. Page in 1996 started a fist fight with the then General Manager Robert Berger. The student in question (Robert Berger) subsequently broke Mr. Page's jaw. The video yearbooks would have a student general manager and utilize a different theme each year.  In 1994 the theme of the video yearbook was "Friends" and utilized a shot for shot recreation of the opening of the then wildly popular Warner Bros. sitcom "Friends".

The high school's newspaper was called The Charger Times. Among its editors was David Rutman.

NMB High School has a Biomedical and Environmental Advancement Magnet program (BEAM) available to all students in the district. The program gives higher education credits to students wishing to pursue a career in medicine or environmental sciences.

In the summer of 2005, the school added a two-story building to its campus.

When Alonzo and Tracy Mourning Senior High Biscayne Bay Campus opened in 2009, it relieved North Miami Beach High.

Demographics
NMBSHS is 72% Black, 21% Hispanic (of any race), 3% Asian/other, and 1% White non-Hispanic.

Academics
North Miami Beach High School offers three magnet programs: AP Capstone pilot program, BEAM (Biomedical and Environmental Advancement Magnet Program) and iPrep. Students who successfully complete the Seminar and Capstone courses, and who earn a 3 or higher on three or more Advanced Placement courses, earn a Credential of Program completion.

Sports
Until a regional high school football stadium was built in the 1990s at the northern Biscayne Bay campus of Florida International University, the NMB Chargers football team played both its home and away games at the northern regional football stadium, Traz Powell Stadium. Located at the then Miami-Dade North Community College campus, now called Miami Dade College, it was more than seven miles (11 km) away from the NMB campus.

Notable alumni 

 Steve Alvers - professional National Football League player
 Garcelle Beauvais - actress and former fashion model
 E.J. Biggers - professional National Football League player
 Oscar Braynon - politician, Florida Senator and Senate Minority Leader  
 Gwen Cooper - bestselling author and lecturer
 Michelle Collins - radio host, comedian, podcast host, former cast member of The View
 Jonathan Cyprien - professional National Football League player
 Debbie Deb - singer and songwriter 
 Louis Delmas - professional National Football League player
 Perry Farrell - singer/songwriter of band Janes Addiction
 Eric Garcia - novelist and screenwriter
 Margie Goldstein-Engle - equestrian show horse champion
 Wymon Henderson - professional football player
 Kemal Ishmael - professional football player
 Jordan Lund - actor
 MC Jin - rapper
 Brad Meltzer - author
 Frank Mottek - broadcast journalist at CBS Los Angeles
 Christine Negroni - broadcast and print journalist, author of The Crash Detectives and Deadly Departure. Air safety specialist. 
 Steve Nicosia - baseball player, 1973 graduate
 Kirill Reznik - politician, Maryland House of Delegates (Maryland General Assembly)
 Sheryl Sandberg - Chief Operating Officer of Facebook
 Cesar Altieri Sayoc Jr., Class of 1980 - criminal, suspect behind October 2018 United States mail bombing attempts
 Walshy Fire - Grammy Award Winning Musician

See also
Miami-Dade County Public Schools
Education in the United States

References

External links
North Miami Beach Senior High School

Miami-Dade County public schools

Educational institutions established in 1971
Miami-Dade County Public Schools high schools
North Miami Beach, Florida
School buildings completed in 1971